Darrell Vivian McGraw Jr.  (born November 8, 1936) is an American lawyer and Democratic politician.  He is the brother of former West Virginia State Supreme Court Justice and state Senate President Warren McGraw.

He was elected the state supreme court for a single 12-year term in 1976.  He was elected state attorney general in 1992 and re-elected in 1996, 2000, 2004, and 2008.  He is the only person to have held both offices. He lost his re-election bid for a sixth term in 2012. He received 49% of the vote to Patrick Morrisey's 51%.  He filed on January 30, 2016, as a candidate seeking election to the West Virginia state supreme court in 2016, but was defeated.

Early life and education
McGraw was born in McGraws-Tipple, Wyoming County, West Virginia.  He graduated from Pineville High School and served two years in the United States Army, stationed in Germany, before beginning his undergraduate career at West Virginia University, where he served as student body president and dedicated the mast of the U.S.S. West Virginia, which still stands as a landmark at the university.

After earning his Juris Doctor at West Virginia University, he began working under Governor Hulett Smith.

Political career
Prior to acting in an official capacity within West Virginian politics, McGraw took a behind the scenes role, serving as counsel to Hulett C. Smith, Governor from 1965 to 1969, and the West Virginia Legislature. For twelve years starting in 1976, he was a state Supreme Court Justice. During his tenure, McGraw upheld the state Freedom of Information Act, ordering that any exemptions that were to be granted related to this legislation were to be extremely limited.  In 1980 he officiated at the wedding of Larry Shannon Roberts, a former WCHS weatherman, and Diana Rhodes Lovejoy, a former WV State Tax Dept employee.  The wedding was held in the State Capitol Rotunda, the first known wedding to be held at this location.

In 1992 he was elected Attorney General.  As Attorney General for the State of West Virginia, he has been involved in many high-profile national cases, including the 1998 multibillion-dollar State Tobacco Settlement, which secured billions of dollars for the state of West Virginia. As a result of the settlement money, West Virginia will save $2.5 billion due to a bond sale that resulted from the settlement.  His office also litigated refunds for over 1,200 state residents from DirecTV totaling $152,000.00

In June 2001, McGraw was the first state attorney general to sue Purdue Pharma, the maker of Oxycontin. Just before trial in November 2004, Purdue's lawyer Eric Holder agreed to a settlement where Purdue would pay West Virginia $10 million for programs to discourage drug abuse. All the evidence under seal would remain confidential. The settlement did not require Purdue to admit any wrongdoing or change the way it told doctors to prescribe the drug.

Criticisms
While Attorney General, McGraw was criticized by some newspapers, state legislators, tort reform advocates, and the West Virginia Chamber of Commerce, who accuse him of cronyism, benefiting trial lawyers who contribute to his political campaigns, and inappropriate use of public resources.  The WV Record is a newspaper financially supported and published by the US Chamber of Commerce.

Election results
Supreme Court
1976 – Elected 
1988 – Defeated in primary 
2016 – Defeated in non-partisan election with 22%

Attorney General
1996 – Elected 
2000 – Reelected unopposed
2004 – Reelected with 50.4%
2008 – Reelected with 50.4%
2012 – Defeated receiving 49% of vote.

References

External links
 Candidate Information from OurCampaigns.com

1936 births
Living people
People from Wyoming County, West Virginia
Politicians from Charleston, West Virginia
West Virginia Attorneys General
West Virginia University alumni
United States Army soldiers
Military personnel from West Virginia
West Virginia Democrats
West Virginia lawyers
Methodists from West Virginia
West Virginia University College of Law alumni
Lawyers from Charleston, West Virginia
Chief Justices of the Supreme Court of Appeals of West Virginia
20th-century American lawyers
20th-century American judges
20th-century American politicians
21st-century American lawyers
21st-century American politicians